Hugo Reinhold (3 March 18544 September 1935) was an Austrian composer and pianist.

He was born and died in Vienna. He was admitted to the  Conservatorium der Musikfreunde, where he studied under Anton Bruckner, Felix Dessoff and Julius Epstein, among others.  He left the conservatory at the age of 20, and later taught piano at the Akademie der Tonkunst in Vienna.

During his lifetime he was quite popular and his works were performed by the Vienna Philharmonic and the Hellmesberger Quartet.

Some of his works include:
 Suite for piano and strings
 Prelude, Minuet and Fugue for strings
 String Quartet in A, Op. 18
 Impromptu in C minor, Op. 28, No. 3, for piano

External links
 
www.kreusch-sheet-music.net - Free Scores by Reinhold
Short biography

1854 births
1935 deaths
Composers from Vienna
Austrian classical pianists
Male classical pianists